Kamnik is a town in northern Slovenia.

Kamnik may also refer to:

Places
Municipality of Kamnik, a municipality in northern Slovenia. The seat of the municipality is the town of Kamnik
Kamnik–Savinja Alps,  a mountain range of the Southern Limestone Alps. They lie in northern Slovenia, except for the northernmost part, which lies in Austria
Kamnik pod Krimom, a village in the Municipality of Brezovica in central Slovenia
Kamnik Bistrica, an Alpine river in northern Slovenia, a left tributary of the Sava River

Sports
NK Kamnik, a Slovenian football club from Kamnik
NK Stol Virtus, a Slovenian football club from Kamnik, sometimes known as NK Stol Kamnik

Others
Kamnik Saddle Lodge, a mountain hostel located just below Kamnik Saddle